Harry Herbert Peterson (April 12, 1890 - January 23, 1985) was an American lawyer, judge and politician.

Background
Peterson was born in Saint Paul, Minnesota. He was the son of Swan Alfred Peterson and Mathilda Christina (Gustafson) Peterson, both of whom were immigrants from Sweden. Peterson graduated from the University of Minnesota Law School in 1912 and entered private practice as an attorney at law in Ramsey County, Minnesota. He married Mabel V. Norquist (1893-1972) on June 28, 1916. They were the parents of two children.

Career
He was elected Ramsey County Attorney to serve 1923–1924 and subsequently served as the Minnesota Attorney General during the Farmer-Labor administration of Floyd B. Olson, 1933–1936. During the Great Depression, Peterson drafted and subsequently defended the constitutionality of the Minnesota Mortgage Moratorium Act, a signature Depression-era reform which sustained the principle that States could adopt moratoria on bank foreclosures.

Peterson went from the Attorney General's office to the Minnesota Supreme Court serving there from 1938–1950, resigning to run for Minnesota Governor. Defeating Orville Freeman in the Democratic-Farmer-Labor Party primary election, he lost the 1950 general election to the Republican candidate, Luther W. Youngdahl.

Upon retirement, Peterson was active in the formation of the Midwestern School of Law where he served as Dean prior to its reorganization as the Hamline University School of Law. Peterson donated his personal law library to the new school and served on its faculty, later dying of a stroke in 1985.

References

Other sources
Minnesota State Law Library Archive of Judicial Biographies

1890 births
1985 deaths
Politicians from Saint Paul, Minnesota
Minnesota Attorneys General
Minnesota Democrats
Hamline University faculty
University of Minnesota Law School alumni
American people of Swedish descent